Mohamed Sobhy Mohamed Daader (born 15 July 1999) is an Egyptian professional footballer who plays as a goalkeeper for Egyptian League club Zamalek.

Honours

Zamalek

Egypt Cup: 2018–19
Egyptian Super Cup: 2019–20
 CAF Super Cup: 2020

Egypt
Africa U-23 Cup of Nations Champions: 2019

Individual
2019 Africa U-23 Cup of Nations Best Goalkeeper

References

External links

1999 births
Living people
Egyptian footballers
Zamalek SC players
Association football goalkeepers
Petrojet SC players
Footballers at the 2020 Summer Olympics
Olympic footballers of Egypt
2021 Africa Cup of Nations players